Boliney, officially the Municipality of Boliney, is a 5th class municipality in the province of Abra, Philippines. According to the 2020 census, it has a population of 4,551 people.

Boliney is bounded to the north by Sallapadan, Bucloc, and Daguioman, to the east by Tubo and the provinces of Kalinga and Mountain Province, and to the west by of Luba and Manabo.

Geography
According to the Philippine Statistics Authority, the municipality has a land area of  constituting  of the  total area of Abra.

Barangays
Boliney is politically subdivided into 8 barangays. These barangays are headed by elected officials: Barangay Captain, Barangay Council, whose members are called Barangay Councilors. All are elected every three years.

Climate

Demographics

In the 2020 census, Boliney had a population of 4,551.

The municipality's population consists of the Cordillera sub-tribes, namely Masadiit of the Tingguian Tribes, Belwang of the Igorot and Balatoc of the Kalinga tribe. Descendants of the other Tinguian sub-tribes are also represented in Boliney such as Binongan, Banao, Maeng, Ammotan (now called Muyadan of Manabo).

Economy

The main source of livelihood of the people of Boliney comes from their rice terraces. But most of their rice lands were either seriously damaged or totally lost due to the landslides, mud piles, and by the killer quakes in 1990 and 1992. They get most of their rice now from Bangued, while other mountain municipalities supplied some of the rice needs of some nearby lowland municipalities.

Government
Boliney, belonging to the lone congressional district of the province of Abra, is governed by a mayor designated as its local chief executive and by a municipal council as its legislative body in accordance with the Local Government Code. The mayor, vice mayor, and the councilors are elected directly by the people through an election which is being held every three years.

Elected officials

Transportation

After 1974, the road was extended by about  before reaching Danac, the farthest barangay. The present-day road is now as far as the Poblacion; however, the rest of the road has been abandoned.

References

External links
 [ Philippine Standard Geographic Code]

Municipalities of Abra (province)